This is a list of equestrian statues in the United States.

List

Alabama

Alaska

Girdwood
Mountain Man, by Frederic Remington, Alyeska Resort cast 1907(?)

Arizona
[[File:Lariat Coyboy by Constance Warren Whitney.png|thumb|185px|right|Lariat Cowboy''', Phoenix]]
Phoenix
 Lariat Cowboy (1926) unveiled in Phoenix, April 21, 1954.Eusebio Francisco Kino, by Julian Martinez, Wesley Bolin Memorial Plaza, 1967.
Prescott
Bucky O'Neill Monument, by Solon Borglum, Yavapai County Courthouse Plaza, 1907.Cowboy at Rest, by Skurja Art Casting, Yavapai County Courthouse Plaza, 1990. A copy after Solon Borglum's 1904 statue (destroyed).

ScottsdaleCome 'n Get It, by Snell Johnson, Rawhide, 1989–90.Jack Knife, by Ed Mell, Main Street & Marshall Way, 1993.

TucsonPancho Villa, by Julian Martinez, Viente de Agosto Park, 1981.Eusebio Francisco Kino, S.J., by Julian Martinez, Kino Boulevard, 1987–89.

Arkansas
Ash FlatBronco Buster, by Frederic Remington, Remington Plaza Shopping Center, 1895, this cast ca. 2001.Coming Through the Rye, by Frederic Remington (smaller version), Remington Plaza Shopping Center, 1902, this cast ca. 2001.The Rattlesnake, by Frederic Remington, Remington Plaza Shopping Center, 1909, this cast ca. 2001.
Hot Springs
 American Pharoah (of the 2015 Triple Crown-winning horse and jockey Victor Espinoza), by James Peniston, Oaklawn Park Race Track, 2017.Horse and Rider Group, by Barvo Walker, Oaklawn Park Race Track, 1985–86.Horse and Rider, by Jan Woods, Oaklawn Park Race Track, 1991.Rockamundo (Racehorse and jockey), by Alan Gipson, Oaklawn Park Race Track, 1989–90.
JonesboroBronco Buster, by Frederic Remington, Indian Mall, 1895.The Cheyenne, by Frederic Remington (smaller version), Caraway Plaza Shopping Center, 1901.End of the Trail, by James Earle Fraser (smaller version), Caraway Plaza Shopping Center, 1894.Mountain Man, by Frederic Remington, Bernard Court Shopping Center, 1903.
North Little RockPioneering is Eternal, by Jack Bryant Jr., Ben E. Keith Foods, 2006.
OzarkBas-relief plaque of Dispatch Rider, by Joseph B. Bond, Sam Dale Monument, Dale County Lake, 1976.
SpringdaleBas-relief of Birdman, by Jack D. Woods, Tyson Foods Corporate Headquarters, 1987.

California
AntiochSpirit Rider of the Season, by David Govedare, Wildhorse Road, 1993. Steel silhouettes of four horses, one rider.
Beverly HillsJohn Wayne, by Harry Jackson, Great Western Bank, 1984.
InglewoodSwaps (Racehorse & Jockey), by Albert Stewart, Hollywood Park Racetrack, 1955.
Los AngelesEmiliano Zapata, by Ignacio Asunsolo, Lincoln Park (Los Angeles), 1908.Angel of the Citadel, by Marino Marini, J. Paul Getty Museum, 1948, this cast 1950.Bas-relief of the Mormon Battalion, by Albert Stewart, Fort Moore Pioneer Memorial, 1954–57Jose Maria Morelos y Pavon, by Julian Martinez, Lincoln Park (Los Angeles), 1981.

OaklandJoaquin Miller – Poet of the Sierras, by Kisa Beeck, Joaquin Miller Park, 1942.
SacramentoPony Express Rider, by Thomas Holland, 2nd & J Streets, 1976.Indian Being Attacked by a Bear, by Spero Anargyros, west pediment, California State Capitol, 1981–82. Recreation of Pietro Mezzara's 1873 statue (lost or destroyed).Woman Being Attacked by a Buffalo,  by Spero Anargyros, west pediment, California State Capitol, 1981–82. Recreation of Pietro Mezzara's 1873 statue (lost or destroyed).

Salinas
Bas-reliefs, by Jo Mora, Monterey County Courthouse, 1937.
San DiegoEl Cid, by Anna Hyatt Huntington, Balboa Park, 1923–30.Youth Taming the Wild (Horse Trainer), by Anna Hyatt Huntington, Balboa Park, 1927, this cast ca. 1930–34.L'Idea del Cavaliere, by Marino Marini, San Diego Museum of Art, 1955.El Charro, by Juan Fernando Olaguibel, Presidio Park, 1969–70.

San FranciscoBillie Filly, Guerrero Park, San Jose/Guerrero/28th Streets, 2009.California Volunteers, by Douglas Tilden, Spanish American War Memorial, Dolores & Market Streets, 1906.Fountain of Energy, by A. Stirling Calder, Panama–Pacific International Exposition, 1915 (demolished).Joan of Arc, by Anna Hyatt Huntington, California Palace of the Legion of Honor, ca. 1922.Simón Bolívar, United Nations Plaza, 1981–84. A copy after Adamo Tadolini's 1874 statue in Caracas, Venezuela.El Cid, by Anna Hyatt Huntington, Lincoln Park (San Francisco), 1921, this cast 1927.
Spandrel bas-reliefs, by Edgar Walter, War Memorial Opera House, 1932.Horse and Rider, by Beniamino Bufano, Westside Court Apartments, 1935–40.Captain Juan Bautista de Anza, by Julian Martinez, Justin Herman Plaza, 1967.

Santa BarbaraCalifornia Cowboy, by Duke Sedgwick, Earl Warren Showgrounds, 1967.
VisaliaEnd of the Trail, by James Earle Fraser, Mooney's Grove Park, 1915, this cast 1971.

Colorado
Colorado Springs William Jackson Palmer, by Nathan Potter, General William J. Palmer High School, 1929.Blota Hunka (Warrior of the Plains), by Don and Charles Green, Colorado Springs Airport, 1980–81.The Champ (Casey Tibbs), by Edd Hayes, ProRodeo Hall of Fame, 1989.

Denver 
Kit Carson, atop the Pioneer Monument, by Frederick MacMonnies, Civic Center Park, 1919.Bronco Buster, by Alexander Phimister Proctor, Civic Center Park, 1920.On the Warpath, by Alexander Phimister Proctor, Civic Center Park, 1923.

JulesburgPony Express Rider, by Brenda Jean Daniher, Fort Sedgwick Museum, 2001.
TrinidadChristopher "Kit" Carson, by Augustus Lukeman (Carson figure) and Frederick Roth (horse), Kit Carson Park, dedicated 1913.

Connecticut
BethelYoung Abe Lincoln, by Anna Hyatt Huntington, Bethel Public Library, 1961.
BridgeportThe Torch Bearers, by Anna Hyatt Huntington, Discovery Museum and Planetarium, ca. 1963.

Brooklyn
Israel Putnam Monument, by Karl Gerhardt, South Cemetery, 1888. The statue is depicted on Brooklyn's town seal.

DanburySybil Ludington (smaller version), by Anna Hyatt Huntington, Danbury Public Library, 1960.
HartfordMarquis de Lafayette, by Paul Wayland Bartlett, Lafayette Circle, 1907, this casting 1932.Count Casimir Pulaski, by Granville Carter, Pulaski Plaza Mall, 1973–76.

ReddingGeneral Israel Putnam, by Anna Hyatt Huntington, Putnam Memorial State Park, 1967.

Delaware
WilmingtonCaesar Rodney, by James Edward Kelly, Rodney Square, 1922–23.

District of ColumbiaAndrew Jackson, by Clark Mills, Lafayette Square, 1852. The oldest equestrian statue in Washington, DC.Lieutenant General George Washington, by Clark Mills, Washington Circle, 1860.Brevet Lt. General Winfield Scott, by Henry Kirke Brown, Scott Circle, 1874.General James B. McPherson, by Louis Rebisso, McPherson Square, 1876.General Nathanael Greene, by Henry Kirke Brown, Stanton Square, 1877.Major General George Henry Thomas, by John Quincy Adams Ward, Thomas Circle, 1878–79.Major General John A. Logan, by Franklin Simmons, Logan Circle, 1893.General Winfield Scott Hancock by Henry Jackson Ellicott, 1896General William Tesumseh Sherman, by Carl Rohl-Smith, General William Tecumseh Sherman Monument, President's Park, 1898–1903.
Ulysses S. Grant Memorial, west side of the U.S. Capitol, 1902–22:Ulysses S. Grant, by Henry Merwin Shrady.Cavalry Charge, by Henry Merwin Shrady.Artillery, by Henry Merwin Shrady.Major General George B. McClellan, by Frederick William MacMonnies, Connecticut Avenue, 1907.
Equestrian statue of Philip Sheridan, by Gutzon Borglum, Sheridan Circle, 1908.Brigadier General Count Casimir Pulaski, by Kazimierz Chodziński, Freedom Plaza, 1910.General Simón Bolívar, by Emile Antoine Bourdelle, Courtyard of the Organization of American States Building, 1914, this cast 1984.Reverend Francis Asbury, by Augustus Lukeman, 16th & Mount Pleasant Streets NW, 1921.Joan of Arc, by Paul DuBois, Meridian Hill Park, 1922.
General Jose de San Martin Memorial, by Augustin-Alexandre Dumont, Foggy Bottom, 1924.The Arts of War: Sacrifice, by Leo Friedlander, Arlington Memorial Bridge, 1929–51.The Arts of War: Valor, by Leo Friedlander, Arlington Memorial Bridge, 1929–51.Reverend John Wesley, by Arthur George Walker, Wesley Theological Seminary, 1932, this cast 1961.General George Washington, by Herbert Haseltine, Washington National Cathedral grounds, 1959. Washington is seated astride Haseltine's 1934 statue of the racehorse Man o' War.General Simón Bolívar, by Felix de Weldon, 18th Street at Virginia Avenue, 1959.General Bernardo de Gálvez, by Juan de Ávalos, near the State Department, 1976.Colonel Michael Kovats de Fabriczy, by Paul Takacs, Embassy of the Republic of Hungary, 2003.

Florida
Jacksonville General Andrew Jackson Reviewing the Troops, by Bob Springer, Jacksonville Landing, 1987. A copy after Clark Mills's 1853 statue in Washington, DC.

Miami BeachEnd of the Trail (The Great Spirit), by Ettore Pellegatta, Pinetree & Flamingo Drives, 1923–24.
Pine Island Ridge
 Major William Lauderdale, by Luis Montoya, Pine Island Road, 1988.

Georgia
AtlantaGeneral John Brown Gordon, by Solon Borglum, Georgia State Capitol, 1907.

Stone MountainConfederate Memorial Carving, by Gutzon Borglum (1916–23), Augustus Lukeman (1923–28); Walker Hancock and Roy Faulkner (1963–72); Stone Mountain Memorial Park, completed 1972. The carving depicts Jefferson Davis, Robert E. Lee and Stonewall Jackson on horseback. It is about 90 feet (26 m) tall and 190 feet (58 m) wide.

Hawaii

Idaho
KelloggSt. George and the Dragon, by David Ray Dose, Hill Street, 1988.
LewistonIndian Summer 1974, by Don D. Joslyn, Nez Perce County Courthouse, 1974.

Illinois
ChicagoGeneral Ulysses S. Grant, by Louis Rebisso, Lincoln Park, 1891.Signal of Peace, by Cyrus Dallin, Lincoln Park, 1894.General John A. Logan, by Augustus Saint-Gaudens (Logan) and Alexander Phimister Proctor (horse), Grant Park (Chicago), 1897.Thaddeus Kosciuszko, by Kasmir Chodzinski, Burnham Park (Chicago), 1904.George Washington Memorial, by Daniel Chester French (Washington) and Edward Clark Potter (horse), Washington Park, 1900, this cast 1903. A replica of French & Potter's statue at the Place d'Iéna in Paris, France.Fountain of Time, by Lorado Taft, Washington Park (Chicago park), 1920–22.General Philip Sheridan, by Gutzon Borglum, Lake Shore Drive at Belmont Avenue, 1923.The Pioneers, by James Earle Fraser, northwest pylon, Michigan Avenue Bridge, 1928.The Bowman and the Spearman, two statues by Ivan Meštrović, Congress Plaza, 1928.Thomas Masaryk Memorial, by Albin Polasek, Hyde Park, Chicago, 1941.

PetersburgAbraham Lincoln on the Prairie (Young Abe Lincoln), by Anna Hyatt Huntington, New Salem State Historic Site, 1961, this cast ca. 1963–64.
St. CharlesFox Chase, by Clemente Spampinato, 1974.
SpringfieldLincoln Tomb: Cavalry Group, by Larkin Goldsmith Mead, 1883.

Indiana
Fort WayneAnthony Wayne Monument, by George Etienne Ganiere, Friedman Square, 1918.

IndianapolisWar and Peace, by Rudolf Schwarz, Soldiers' and Sailors' Monument, Monument Circle, 1901

MuncieAppeal to the Great Spirit (smaller version), by Cyrus Edwin Dallin, Walnut & Granville Streets, ca. 1922.

Iowa
Burlington General John Murray Corse, by Carl Rohl-Smith, Crapo Park, 1896.
Des Moines Iowa Soldiers' and Sailors' Monument, by Carl Rohl-Smith, Iowa State Capitol, 1890–96. Four equestrian statues:General Marcellus M. CrockerGeneral John M. CorseGeneral Grenville M. DodgeGeneral Samuel R. CurtisKeokukSamuel Ryan Curtis Memorial, unknown artist, Victory Park, 1898.

Kansas
Fort Leavenworth Buffalo Soldier Monument, by Eddie Dixon, 1991–92.

McPhersonThe Reconnoissance (General James B. McPherson), by John Paulding, Memorial Park, McPherson County Courthouse, 1917.

MaryvillePony Express Rider, by Richard Bergen, 1985

Kentucky
Lexington 
John Hunt Morgan Memorial, by Pompeo Coppini, (former) Fayette County Courthouse, 1909–11.

Louisville 
John B. Castleman Monument, by Roland Hinton Perry, Cherokee Triangle, 1912–14.
Bellarmine Knight, by Bob Lockhart, Bellarmine University campus. 

RichmondEquestrian ("Mounted Policeman"), by Felix de Weldon, Eastern Kentucky University College of Law Enforcement, 1975–76.

Louisiana
New OrleansAndrew Jackson, by Clark Mills, Jackson Square, 1856.Army of Tennessee – Louisiana Division (Albert Sidney Johnston), by Alexander Doyle, Metairie Cemetery, 1877.
P.G.T. Beauregard Monument, by Alexander Doyle, City Park (New Orleans), 1915.Bernardo de Galvez, by Juan de Ávalos, International Trade Mart, 1976–77. A replica of de Ávalos's statue in Washington, DC.

Maine

Maryland
BaltimoreJohn Eager Howard Monument, by Emmanuel Frémiet, Mount Vernon Place, 1904.Lafayette Monument, by Andrew O'Connor, Mount Vernon Place, 1924.Lee-Jackson Monument, by Laura Gardin Fraser, Wyman Park, 1935–48.Pulaski Monument, by Hans Schuler, Patterson Park, 1942–51.

KeedysvilleRobert E. Lee Monument, by Ron Moore, the newest monument on the Antietam Battlefield, erected June 24, 2003.

Massachusetts
BostonGeorge Washington, by Thomas Ball, Public Garden (Boston), 1869.Robert Gould Shaw Memorial, by Augustus Saint-Gaudens, Boston Common, 1884.General Joseph Hooker, by Daniel Chester French (Hooker) and Edward Clark Potter (horse), Massachusetts Statehouse, 1903.Appeal to the Great Spirit, by Cyrus Dallin, Museum of Fine Arts, Boston, 1909.Paul Revere, by Cyrus Dallin, Paul Revere Plaza, North End, Boston, 1940.

Danvers William Penn Hussey, by George Thomas Brewster, New England Home for the Deaf, 1916.
Gloucester Joan of Arc, by Anna Hyatt Huntington, 1910, this cast 1921.
Fall RiverLafayette by Ettore and Arnaldo Zucchi, Lafayette Park, 1916

MilfordWilliam Draper, by Daniel Chester French (Draper) and Francis Herman Packer (horse), Draper Park, 1910–1912.

WalpoleLieutenant Barchariah Lewis, by S. Barnicoat, Lewis Square, 1911.

WorcesterGeneral Charles Devens Memorial, by Daniel Chester French (Devens) and Edward Clark Potter (horse), Main & Highland Streets, 1905–06.

Michigan
Detroit Thaddeus Kosciuszko, by Victor Zin, Michigan-Third Street Park, 1978. A copy after Leonard Marconi's 1904 statue in Kraków, Poland.Major General Alpheus Starkey Williams, by Henry Merwin Shrady, Belle Isle Park, 1921.

MidlandAbraham Lincoln Equestrian Monument (Young Abe Lincoln), by Anna Hyatt Huntington, Northwood Institute, Midland, 1961, this casting 1963.

George Armstrong Custer-Monroe.

Abraham Lincoln, Adrian College Library, same as the Northwood Lincoln, but much smaller.

Minnesota

BloomingtonChief Thunderbird, by Robert Johnson, Thunderbird Hotel, 1980.
St Paul
 Progress of the State, Minnesota State Capitol by Daniel Chester French and Edward Clark Potter, 1906

Mississippi
VicksburgIowa Monument, by Henry Hudson Kitson, Vicksburg National Military Park, 1906–07.Major-General Ulysses S. Grant, by Frederick Cleveland Hibbard, Vicksburg National Military Park, 1919.Major-General John A. McClernand, by Edward Clark Potter, Vicksburg National Military Park, 1919.

Missouri
Independence Andrew Jackson, by Charles Keck, Independence Square Courthouse, 1934, this cast 1949. It is a smaller edition of Keck's statue in Kansas City, Missouri.
Kansas CityGeorge Washington at Valley Forge, by Henry Shrady, Washington Park, 1906, this cast 1925. A replica of Shrady's statue in Brooklyn, New York City.J.C. Nichols Memorial Fountain, by Henri-Léon Gréber, Country Club Plaza, 1910. Relocated in the 1950s from Harbor Hill in Roslyn, New York. The four equestrian statues may be allegorical figures of major rivers, with the Native American rider representing the Mississippi River.The Scout, by Cyrus Dallin, Penn Valley Park, overlooking Downtown Kansas City, 1915.Pioneer Mother, Alexander Phimister Proctor, Penn Valley Park, 1923.Andrew Jackson by Charles Keck, Jackson County Courthouse, 1934.The Wagon Master, by Gus Shafer, Intercontinental Hotel, 1973.

St. JosephPony Express Memorial, by Hermon Atkins MacNeil, Civic Center Triangle, 1940.

St. LouisApotheosis of St. Louis, by Charles Henry Niehaus, Saint Louis Art Museum, 1903.General Franz Sigel, by Robert Cauer, Forest Park, 1906.Monument to Camp Jackson (General Nathaniel Lyon), by Erhardt Siebert, Lyon Park, 1929.Courage, Sacrifice, Loyalty, Vision, by Walker Hancock, Soldiers' Memorial, 1938–39.

Montana
Billings7th Cavalry Guidon Trooper, by Lyndon Fayne Pomeroy, KTVQ, 1978.
BozemanPioneer Nelson Story, by Jim Dolan, Lindley Park, 1984.
ConradThe Cowboy, by Jim Dolan, Conrad High School, ca. 1983.
HelenaThomas Francis Meagher, by Charles J. Mulligan, in front of Montana State Capitol, 1904–05.

Miles CityHorse and Rider, by Leo L. Olson, Custer County High School, 1971.
Wolf PointHomage to the Pioneers, by Floyd Tennyson DeWitt, Main Street, 1976

Nebraska

Nevada
Las VegasTribute to a Cowboy, by Deborah Copenhaver, South Point Hotel & Casino, 1988.
StatelinePony Express Rider, by Avard Fairbanks, Harrah's Hotel & Casino Lake Tahoe, 1962.

New Hampshire
Manchester General Casimir Pulaski, by Lucien H. Gosselin, Pulaski Park, 1937–38.
PortsmouthGeneral Fitz John Porter, by James Edward Kelly, Haven Park, 1904–06.

New Jersey
HobokenThe Torch Bearers, by Anna Hyatt Huntington, Stevens Institute of Technology, 1953–55.

Madison Francis Asbury, by Augustus Lukeman, Drew University, 1926.

Morristown 
George Washington, by Frederick Roth, Washington's Headquarters, 1927–1928.

Newark 
George Washington, by J. Massey Rhind, Washington Park, 1912.Bartolommeo Colleoni, by J. Massey Rhind, Clinton Park, 1912–16. A copy after Andrea del Verrocchio's ca. 1488 statue in Venice, Italy.Wars of America, by Gutzon Borglum, Military Park (Newark), 1926.

Princeton
Princeton Battle Monument, by Frederick MacMonnies, Nassau Street, 1908–22.

New Mexico
AlcaldeEl Adelantado (Juan de Oñate Monument), by Reynaldo Rivera, Oñate Monument & Visitors Center, 1991–92. - Removed in 2020.
Santa FeJourney's End (Don Diego de Peralta), by Reynaldo Rivera, Santa Fe Municipal Airport, 1989.The Founding of Santa Fe (Pedro de Peralta), by Dave McGary, Grant Park, 1992.

New York
AlbanyGeneral Philip Henry Sheridan Memorial, designed by John Quincy Adams Ward and completed by Daniel Chester French in 1916
BuffaloFrancisco Pizarro Monument, by Charles Cary Rumsey, Albright-Knox Art Gallery, 1910, this cast 1920.General Daniel Davidson Bidwell, by Sahl Swarz, Colonial Circle, 1952.

CarmelSybil Ludington, by Anna Hyatt Huntington, Glenedia Lake, 1960–61.

New York City
ManhattanGeorge III (destroyed), by Joseph Winton, raised in Bowling Green Park, 1770; melted down for musket balls, 1776. The statue's base and tail survive at the New York Historical Society.George Washington, by Henry Kirke Brown and John Quincy Adams Ward, Union Square, 1856.General William Tecumseh Sherman, by Augustus Saint-Gaudens, Central Park, Fifth Avenue at 59th Street, 1903.Franz Sigel, by Karl Bitter, Riverside Park at 106th Street, 1907.Joan of Arc, by Anna Hyatt Huntington, Riverside Park at 93rd Street, 1915.Simón Bolívar, by Sally James Farnham, Central Park South at Avenue of the Americas, 1921.El Cid, by Anna Hyatt Huntington, Hispanic Society of America, 1927.King Jagiello Monument, by Stanislaw Kazimierz Ostowski, Central Park, pre-1939.Theodore Roosevelt, by James Earle Fraser, American Museum of Natural History, Central Park West, 1940.Don Quichote,  by Anna Hyatt Huntington, Hispanic Society of America, 1942.Peace, by Antun Augustinčić, United Nations Gardens, 1954.José Martí, by Anna Hyatt Huntington, Central Park, 1965.

BrooklynBas-relief of Abraham Lincoln, by William R. O'Donovan (Lincoln) and Thomas Eakins (horse), Soldiers' and Sailors' Arch, Grand Army Plaza, 1892.Bas-relief of Ulysses S. Grant, by William R. O'Donovan (Grant) and Thomas Eakins (horse), Soldiers' and Sailors' Arch, Grand Army Plaza, 1892.Columbia (Quadriga), by Frederick MacMonnies, Soldiers' and Sailors' Arch, Grand Army Plaza, 1894–98.General Grant, by William Ordway Partridge, Grant Square, 1896.The Horse Tamers, by Frederick MacMonnies, Prospect Park, 1899.General Henry Warner Slocum, by Frederick MacMonnies, Grand Army Plaza, 1905.Washington at Valley Forge, by Henry Shrady, Continental Army Plaza, 1906.

Oyster BayTheodore Roosevelt, by Alexander Phimister Proctor, Berry Hill Road & South Street, 1921, this cast 2005. A replica of Proctor's statue in Portland, Oregon.
SyracuseGeneral Gustavus Sniper, by Frederick Moynihan, Schlosser Park, 1904–05.
Bas-relief panels of The Call to Arms and Mending the Flag, by Cyrus Edwin Dallin, Soldiers' and Sailors' Monument, Clinton Square, 1909–10.Young Abe Lincoln, by Anna Hyatt Huntington, Syracuse University, 1961, this cast 1963.

West PointWashington Monument (West Point), by Henry Kirke Brown, United States Military Academy, 1856, this cast 1916. A replica of Brown's statue in Union Square, New York City.

North Carolina
Greensboro Nathanael Greene Monument, by Francis Herman Packer, Guilford Courthouse National Military Park, 1913–15.

RaleighPresidents North Carolina Gave the Nation (James Polk, Andrew Jackson, Andrew Johnson), by Charles Keck, North Carolina State Capitol, Raleigh, North Carolina, 1948.

North Dakota
BismarckTheodore Roosevelt, by Alexander Phimister Proctor, State Historical Society of North Dakota, 1922. The full-size plaster model for Proctor's statues in Portland, Oregon and Minot, North Dakota.
MandanTheodore Roosevelt, by Alexander Phimister Proctor, 3rd Avenue & Main Street, 1924. A smaller version of Proctor's statue in Portland, Oregon.
MinotTheodore Roosevelt, by Alexander Phimister Proctor, Roosevelt Park, 1922, this cast 1924. A replica of Proctor's statue in Portland, Oregon.
RegentTheodore Roosevelt Rides Again, by Gary Greff, Enchanted Highway, Regency-Gladstone Road, 1993. A 51-foot-tall cartoon outlined in metal pipe depicting Roosevelt astride a rearing horse.

Ohio
Cincinnati
President William Henry Harrison, by Louis Rebisso, Piatt Park, 1895–96.

Dayton
John Henry Patterson Monument by Giuseppe Moretti, Hills and Dales Park, 1925–28.

Oklahoma
ClaremoreRiding Into the Sunset (Will Rogers), by Electra Waggoner Biggs, Will Rogers Memorial, 1941–50.George Washington, by Yon Sim Pak, Rogers State University, 1987.

Oklahoma City Tribute to Range Riders, by Constance Whitney Warren, Oklahoma State Capitol, 1926–29.
StillwaterThe OSU Spirit Rider, by Jim L. Hamilton, Oklahoma State University, 1994.

TulsaAppeal to the Great Spirit (smaller version in plaster), by Cyrus Edwin Dallin, Central High School, ca. 1922. This plaster example was used to cast a bronze version in 1985.Appeal to the Great Spirit (smaller version in bronze), by Cyrus Edwin Dallin, Woodward Park, ca. 1922, this cast 1985.

Oregon
Lincoln CityAbraham Lincoln on Horseback (Young Abe Lincoln), by Anna Hyatt Huntington, 22nd Street & Quay Avenue, 1961, this cast 1965.
PortlandJoan of Arc, by Emmanuel Frémiet, Coe Circle, Laurelhurst, 1890, this cast 1924.Theodore Roosevelt, Rough Rider, by Alexander Phimister Proctor, South Park Blocks, 1922.

SalemThe Circuit Rider, by Alexander Phimister Proctor, Oregon State Capitol, 1922–23.Lewis and Clark Memorial, by Leo Friedlander, Oregon State Capitol, 1934.

Pennsylvania
GettysburgDiscovering the Enemy, 9th New York Cavalry Monument, by Caspar Buberl, 1888.17th Pennsylvania Cavalry Monument, by Smith Granite Company, 1889.8th Pennsylvania Cavalry Monument, by J.M. Gessler, ca. 1890.Major-General Meade, by Henry Kirke Bush-Brown, Cemetery Ridge, 1896.General Winfield Scott Hancock, by Frank Edwin Ellwell, Cemetery Hill, 1896.Major-General Slocum, by Edward Clark Potter, McPherson Ridge, 1898.General John F. Reynolds, by Henry Kirke Bush-Brown, Gettysburg Battlefield, 1898–99.General John Sedgwick, by Henry Kirke Bush-Brown, Gettysburg Battlefield, 1910–13.Major-General Robert E. Lee atop Virginia State Monument, by Frederick William Sievers, 1917.General Oliver O. Howard, by Robert Aitken, Gettysburg Battlefield, 1932.

HanoverThe Sentry (also called The Pickett or The Cavalryman), by Cyrus Edwin Dallin, Center Square, 1904.

Harrisburg General John Fredderic Hartranft, by Frederick W. Ruckstull, Pennsylvania State Capitol, 1897–99.

PhiladelphiaThe Amazon, by August Kiss, Philadelphia Museum of Art, 1837, this cast 1929.The Lion Fighter, by Albert Wolff, Philadelphia Museum of Art, 1858.Pegasus (pair of statues), by Vincent Pilz, Memorial Hall, ca. 1863. Rejected for the Vienna State Operahouse, they were installed in Philadelphia in 1876.General John Fulton Reynolds, by John Rogers, Philadelphia City Hall, 1884.General George Gordon Meade, by Alexander Milne Calder, Philadelphia City Hall, 1887.Joan of Arc, by Emmanuel Frémiet, Fairmount Park, 1890.General George B. McClellan, by Henry Jackson Ellicott, Philadelphia City Hall, 1894.Washington Monument, by Rudolf Siemering, Eakins Oval, 1897.General Ulysses S. Grant, by Daniel Chester French (Grant) and Edward Clark Potter (horse), Fairmount Park, 1897.The Medicine Man, by Cyrus Dallin, Fairmount Park, 1899.Cowboy, by Frederic Remington, Fairmount Park, 1908.General Winfield Scott Hancock, by John Quincy Adams Ward, Smith Memorial Arch, 1910.General George B. McClellan, by Edward Clark Potter, Smith Memorial Arch, 1912.General Anthony Wayne, by John Gregory, Philadelphia Museum of Art, 1937.

Pittsburgh
George Washington Memorial, by Edward Ludwig Albert Pausch, Allegheny Commons Park, 1891. 
Sir Samelot, Tustin and Seneca Streets. Dedicated October, 2011.

ReadingMajor General David McMurtrie Gregg, by Augustus Lukeman, 4th Street & Centre Avenue, 1922.

Rhode Island
ProvidenceMajor General Ambrose E. Burnside, by Launt Thompson, Burnside Park, 1887.Marcus Aurelius, replica of the Roman Equestrian Statue of Marcus Aurelius, Brown University, 1908.General Pulaski, by Guido Nincheri, Roger Williams Park, 1953.

South Carolina
ColumbiaWade Hampton III, by Frederick W. Ruckstull, South Carolina State House, 1903–06.The Torch Bearers, by Anna Hyatt Huntington, Wardlaw College of Education, University of South Carolina, 1953, this cast 1963–65.The Boy of The Waxhaws (Andrew Jackson), by Anna Hyatt Huntington, Garrett Gardens, Columbia College, 1967.

LancasterThe Boy of The Waxhaws (Andrew Jackson), by Anna Hyatt Huntington, Andrew Jackson State Park, 1967.
Murrells InletYouth Taming the Wild, by Anna Hyatt Huntington, Brookgreen Gardens, 1927.Riders of the Dawn, by Adolph A. Weinman, Brookgreen Gardens, ca. 1942.Don Quichote, by Anna Hyatt Huntington, Brookgreen Gardens, 1946–47.Pegasus, by Laura Gardin Fraser, Brookgreen Gardens, 1946–54.Fighting Stallions, by Anna Hyatt Huntington, Brookgreen Gardens, 1950.Sancho Panza, by Carl Paul Jennewein, Brookgreen Gardens, 1971.

South Dakota
Belle FourcheLasting Legacy, by Tony R. Chytka, 5th Avenue & National Street, 1989.
Custer CountyThe Spirit of Crazy Horse (work in progress), by Korczak Ziolkowski, Crazy Horse Memorial, Thunderhead Mountain, begun 1948. Approximately 563 feet (172 m) tall and 641 feet (195 m) wide.

Tennessee

Memphis Pony Express, by Avard Fairbanks, Promus Companies, 1983Nathan Bedford Forrest Monument by Charles Henry Niehaus 1905, removed, present location unknown
 Nashville 
Nathan Bedford Forrest Equestrian Statue by Jack Kershaw, dedicated July 11, 1998.  Located on south of Nashville beside I-65 North.
PalmyraAndrew Jackson, by Enoch Tanner Wickham, 1961.Dr. John W. Wickham, by Enoch Tanner Wickham, 1959.

Texas

Austin Monument to Terry's Texas Rangers, by Pompeo Coppini, Texas State Capitol, 1901–07.Littlefield Memorial Fountain, by Pompeo Coppini, University of Texas at Austin, 1919–33.The Cowboy, by Constance Whitney Warren, Texas State Capitol, 1921–25.

BallingerSpirit of the Texas Cowboy (1917–19), by Pompeo Coppini, Charles H. Noyes Memorial, Courthouse Square.
CliftonOn the Banks of the Bosque (2007), by Bruce R. Greene, Heritage Plaza.

DallasRiding Into the Sunset (Will Rogers), by Electra Waggoner Biggs, Loews Anatole Hotel, 1941, this cast 1989. A replica of Biggs's statue in Fort Worth, Texas.
DentonDiego Velazques, by Constance Whitney Warren, University of North Texas, 1924.
Juan de Oñate "The Equestrian" Monument, by John Sherrill Houser, El Paso International Airport, 2006. Height: 36 ft. (11 m)

Fort WorthRiding Into the Sunset (Will Rogers), by Electra Waggoner Biggs, Will Rogers Memorial Center, late-1930s–1942.Texas Gold, by T.D. Kelsey, Texas Longhorn Breeders Association of America, 1984. A lifesize sculpture group of a horse and rider with seven longhorn steer.High Desert Princess, by Mehl Lawson, National Cowgirl Museum and Hall of Fame, 2003.

HoustonSam Houston, by Enrico Filiberto Cerracchio, Hermann Park, 1925.The Pilgrim, by Marino Marini, Houston Museum of Fine Arts, 1939.

HuntForever We'll Ride (2009), by Bruce R. Greene, Tejas Vanqueros Campground.
LubbockRiding Into the Sunset (Will Rogers), by Electra Waggoner Biggs, Texas Tech University, 1941–48.

Utah
St. GeorgeThe Rebels, by Jerry Anderson, Dixie College, 1985–87.Jacob Hamblin and Indian Child, by Angelo Caravaglia, Dixie College, 1986–91.
Salt Lake CityThis Is the Place Monument, equestrian bas-reliefs by Mahonri Mackintosh Young and Spero Anargyros, This Is the Place Heritage Park, 1945–47.

SpringvilleMountain Man, by Angelo Caravaglia, Springville Museum of Art, 1982–86. The museum also has a collection of works by Cyrus Edwin Dallin.Sixty Years in the Saddle, by Scott Myers, South & Main Streets, 1992–93.

Vermont
BenningtonCivil War Memorial (Bronze bas-relief plaque of marching soldiers), by William Gordon Huff, outside Bennington Museum, 1930.

Virginia
Arlington
Philip Kearny, by Edward Clark Potter, Arlington National Cemetery, 1912–14.
Field Marshal Sir John Dill, by Herbert Haseltine, Arlington National Cemetery, 1950.

Charlottesville George Rogers Clark, by Robert Aitken, University of Virginia, 1921.Stonewall Jackson, by Charles Keck, Jackson Park, 1921.Robert E. Lee, by Henry Shrady, completed by Leo Lentelli, Lee Park, 1924.

Manassas"Stonewall" Jackson, by Joseph Pollia, Henry Hill, Manassas National Battlefield Park, 1940.

Newport NewsYouth Conquering the Wild by Anna Hyatt Huntington, Mariners' Museum, 1927, this cast 1930.
NorfolkThe Torch Bearers, by Anna Hyatt Huntington, Chrysler Museum of Art, 1953, this cast 1956–57.
RichmondRumors of War, Kehinde Wiley, Virginia Museum of Fine Arts, 2019.Washington Monument, Thomas Crawford, 1857.
The following statues are located on Monument Avenue.Robert E. Lee - REMOVED 2021, by Antonin Mercié, 1890.JEB Stuart - REMOVED 2021, by Frederick Moynihan, 1907.Stonewall Jackson - REMOVED 2021, by Frederick William Sievers, 1919.

Washington
VantageGrandfather Cuts Loose the Ponies by David Govedare 1989, 15 galloping horses located on a ridge overlooking the Columbia River

West Virginia
CharlestonHenry Gassaway Davis, by Louis Saint-Lanne, Davis Park, 1926.
Clarksburg "Stonewall" Jackson, by Charles Keck, Harrison County Courthouse, 1921, this cast 1953. A replica of Keck's statue in Charlottesville, Virginia.

Wisconsin
MilwaukeeGeneral Thaddeus Kosciuszko, by Gaetano Trentanove, Kosciuszko Park, 1906.Brigadier General Erastus B. Wolcott, by Francis Herman Packer, Lake Park, 1920.Baron Friedrich Wilhelm von Steuben, by J. Otto Schweizer, West Lisbon Avenue, 1921.

Wyoming
CasperLieutenant Caspar W. Collins, by Pershing Geiger, Casper Events Center, 1981.
CodyJohn Jeremiah "Liver-Eating" Johnston, by Peter M. Fillerup, Old Trail Town, ca. 1974.
Jackson*Cowboy'', by Bud Boller, George Washington Memorial Park, 1976.

References

United States
Lists of buildings and structures in the United States